Grattepanche is a commune in the Somme department in Hauts-de-France in northern France.

Geography

Population

Places of interest
 The church
 The war memorial
 The calvary

See also
Communes of the Somme department

References

External links

 Official municipal website 

Communes of Somme (department)